Sang pour sang is a 1999 album recorded by French singer Johnny Hallyday. It was released on 13 September 1999, and achieved huge success in France and Belgium (Wallonia), where it topped the charts and stayed on the charts for respectively two and one years. It provided five top 15 singles in France : "Vivre pour le meilleur" (No. 2), "Un jour viendra" (No. 6), "Sang pour sang" (No. 9), "Partie de cartes" (No. 13) and "Pardon" (No. 9). David Hallyday, Johnny's son, participated in the composition of all the songs of the album, along with Miossec and Zazie.

Track listing
 "Sang pour sang" (Eric Chemouny, David Hallyday) — 4:15
 "Le poids de mes maux" (Zazie, David Hallyday) — 4:53
 "Quelques cris" (Françoise Sagan, David Hallyday) — 5:25
 "Un jour viendra" (Michel Mallory, David Hallyday) — 4:04
 "Notre histoire" (Miossec, David Hallyday) — 3:59
 "Les larmes de gloire" (Vincent Ravalec, David Hallyday) — 3:30
 "Si tu m'aimais" (Michel Mallory, David Hallyday) — 5:21
 "Remise de peine" (Miossec, David Hallyday) — 4:21
 "Partie de cartes" (Vincent Ravalec, David Hallyday) — 4:16
 "Pardon" (Philippe Labro, David Hallyday) — 3:57
 "Ex" (Miossec, David Hallyday) — 4:47
 "Je t'aime comme je respire" (Pierre Grillet, David Hallyday) — 4:52
 "Vivre pour le meilleur" (Lionel Florence, David Hallyday) — 4:32

Source : Allmusic.

Charts

Peak positions

End of year charts

Certifications and sales

Releases

References

1999 albums
Johnny Hallyday albums